Michael John Buss (born 4 June 1955) is the President of the Court of Appeal of the Supreme Court of Western Australia. He was appointed to that position on 18 July 2016, having previously been a Judge of the Supreme Court.

Education 
Buss was born in New South Wales. He moved to Western Australia and completed studies in jurisprudence and law at the University of Western Australia.

Legal career 
He initially practised as a solicitor in Perth. He joined the independent bar in Western Australia in 1987, making appearances in the High Court of Australia. He was appointed a Queen's Counsel in December 1993. He was appointed as a Judge of the Supreme Court (including the Court of Appeal) on 1 February 2006 and as President of the Court of Appeal on 18 July 2016.

References

Living people
1955 births
Judges of the Supreme Court of Western Australia
Australian King's Counsel